Kappos v. Hyatt, 566 U.S. 431 (2012), was a case decided by the Supreme Court of the United States that held that there are no limitations on a plaintiff's ability to introduce new evidence in a §145 proceeding other than those in the Federal Rules of Evidence and the Federal Rules of Civil Procedure. The petitioner in the case was David Kappos, who was then serving as Director of the United States Patent and Trademark Office (USPTO).

See also 
 List of United States Supreme Court cases, volume 566

References

External links
 
 Coverage of the case on SCOTUSblog

United States Supreme Court cases
United States patent case law
2012 in United States case law
United States Supreme Court cases of the Roberts Court